John Lawrence Oncley (February 14, 1910 – July 14, 2004) was an American biochemist, and Professor Emeritus at University of Michigan.

Life
He graduated from Southwestern College, and University of Wisconsin with a Ph.D. in 1932.

He taught at University of Michigan from 1962 to 1980.

Martha L. Ludwig was the J. Lawrence Oncley Distinguished University Professor of Biological Chemistry until she died in 2006.

Awards
1942 ACS Award in Pure Chemistry
He was a member of the National Academy of Sciences.

References

1910 births
2004 deaths
American biochemists
Members of the United States National Academy of Sciences
University of Michigan faculty
Presidents of the Biophysical Society